Arthritis Research & Therapy, formerly Arthritis Research, is a peer-reviewed open access medical journal covering the field of cellular and molecular mechanisms of arthritis, musculoskeletal conditions, and systemic autoimmune rheumatic diseases. It is published by BioMed Central, part of Springer Nature, and the editors-in-chief are Christopher Buckley (University of Birmingham and University of Oxford) and Harris Perlman (Northwestern University). The journal was established in 1999 as Arthritis Research, obtaining its current title in. The journal's print version ceased in 2010 with volume 12, number 6, and the journal converted to an online only format. According to the Journal Citation Reports, the journal has a 2017 impact factor of 4.269.

References

External links 
 

Rheumatology journals
BioMed Central academic journals
Publications established in 1999
English-language journals